Innocent Chinyoka (born 21 June 1982) is a Zimbabwean first-class cricketer who plays for Mashonaland Eagles.

References

External links
 

1982 births
Living people
Zimbabwean cricketers
CFX Academy cricketers
Mashonaland Eagles cricketers
Sportspeople from Harare